This is a list of Arabic theophoric names.

Islamic names

Abdul with names of God 
Following are names consisting of the appellation abdul, "servant of", followed by one of the names associated with God in the Qur'an.
Abdullah
Abdul Ahad
Abdul Akbar
Abdul Alim
Abdul Ali
Abdul Ati
Abdul Azim
Abdul Aziz
Abdul Bari
Abdul Baqi
Abdul Barr
Abdul Basir
Abdul Basit
Abdul Batin
Abdul Fattah
Abdul Ghaffar
Abdul Ghafur
Abdul Ghani
Abdul Haafiz
Abdul Haakim
Abdul Hadi
Abdul Hafiz
Abdul Hakam
Abdul Hakim
Abdul Halim
Abdul Hamid
Abdul Haq
Abdul Hasib
Abdul Hai
Abdul Jabbar
Abdul Jalil
Abdul Jamil
Abdul Kafi
Abdul Karim
Abdul Khaliq
Abdul Latif
Abdul Maajid
Abdul Majeed
Abdul Maalik
Abdul Malik
Abdul Mannan
Abdul Matin
Abdul Muhaimin
Abdul Muid
Abdul Muizz
Abdul Mujib
Abdul Mumin
Abdul Monem
Abdul Muqit
Abdul Muqtadir
Abdul Musawwir
Abdul Mutali
Abdul Muti
Abdul Nabi
Abdul Nasir
Abdul Nur
Abdul Qadir
Abdul Qahir
Abdul Qawi
Abdul Qayyum
Abdul Quddus
Abdur Rab
Abdur Rafi
Abdur Rahim
Abdur Rahman
Abdur Raqib
Abdur Rashid
Abdur Rauf
Abdur Razzaq
Abdur Rida
Abdus Sabur
Abdus Salam
Abdul Samad
Abdus Sami
Abdus Sattar
Abdus Shakur
Abdus Subhan
Abdul Tawwab
Abdul Wahid
Abdul Wadud
Abdul Wahhab
Abdul Wakil
Abdul Wali
Abdul Wasi
Abdul Zahir

Allah suffix – of Allah

Amanullah
Aminullah
Asadullah
Ataullah
Atiqullah
Azimullah
Azizullah
Baha'allah
Baitullah
Barkatullah
Billah
Daifallah
Dhikrullah
Faizullah
Fathallah
Fazlallah
Ihsanullah
Habibullah
Hafizullah
Hamidullah
Hayatullah
Hibat Allah
Hidayatullah
Lutfullah
Ikramullah
Inayatullah
Ismatullah
Izzatullah
Khaleelullah
Kaleemullah
Karamatallah
 Khalilullah
Mashallah
Muhibullah
Najibullah
Naqibullah
Nasrallah
Nimatullah
Nurullah
Obaidullah
Qudratullah
Rahmatullah
Rasoolullah
Rizqallah
Ruhullah
Saadallah
Saifullah
Safiullah
Sanaullah
Samiullah
Shafiqullah
Sharifullah
Sibghathullah
Ubaydallah
Waliullah
Yadollah
Zabihallah
Zafarullah

Zakatullah is also reported in Pakistan (Zakat = handout, Allah is the name of God)

ad-Din suffix – Faith,Creed

Rahman — Compassionate

Abdur Rahman
Anisur Rahman 
Ata-ur-Rahman
Azizur Rahman
Fazl ur Rahman
Habib ur Rahman
Khalil-ur-Rehman
Lutfur Rahman
Matiur Rahman
Mizanur Rahman
Saifur Rahman
Shafiq ur Rahman
Shamsur Rahman
Ziaur Rahman
Muneeb Ur Rehman
Asif Ur Rehman
Ateeq Ur Rehman
Fasi Ur Rehman

Others

Abdul Rasul
Abdolreza
Abdul Hussein

Non-Islamic names

Pre-Islamic
Abdul Uzza
Abd Manaf
Wahabullat, Vaballathus, the name of the Son of Zenobia, the Queen of Palmyra

Arab Christian
Abdul Masih, "servant of the Messiah"
Abdel Salib, "servant of the Cross"
Abdel Shahid, "servant of the Martyr"

References

External links
Islamic Names, List of Islamic Names for Servants of Allah Names

Lists of names